lansana Sheriff (born on August 28, 1966 in Daru, Kailahun District, Sierra Leone) popularly known by his stage name Steady Bongo, is an internationally recognized Sierra Leonean musician and record producer. He is one of the most famous musicians from Sierra Leone.

Biography
Lansana Sheriff better known as Steady Bongo was born in Daru, a rural town in Kailahun District in Eastern Sierra Leone to an ethnic Mandingo father and a Mende mother. Steady Bongo grew up in a largely Mende speaking household in Daru. From an early age, he performed on stage, imitating musicians such as the legendary Big Fayia, Samile, Eric Donaldson, and Prince Nico. He hosted a program called "Variety Time" at the Sierra Leone Broadcasting Service (SLBS). His first album, Ready Before You Married, was released in 1990 and became an instant success not only in Sierra Leone, but in neighbouring countries as well. His second album Kormot Bi En Me, released in 1996, received the Best Album Award and had record-breaking sales. The album  was the first of Steady Bongo's records to be released on CD in the United States. In 1998, he released Welcome to Democracy Na Salone and Born For Suffer in 1999.
He's one of the first musicians that popularised Sierra Leone music to the outside world.

Discography
Ready Before You Married (1992)
Kormot Bi En Me (1996)
Welcome to Democracy Na Salone (1998)
Born For Suffer (1999)

External links
http://steadybongo.com/ 
https://www.facebook.com/steady.bongo

Sierra Leonean male singers
Living people
1966 births
Sierra Leonean Mandingo people
Mende people
People from Kailahun District